Colin Brittan (2 June 1927 – 4 April 2013) was an English professional footballer who played for Bristol North Old Boys, Tottenham Hotspur and Bedford Town.

Playing career

Brittan began his career with non-League club Bristol North Old Boys before joining Tottenham Hotspur in October, 1948. The wing half played a significant part in the push and run championship winning team of 1950-51 when he notched up eight appearances. Brittan played in a total of 45 matches in all competitions and scored once between 1950–57 at White Hart Lane.

Honours 
Tottenham Hotspur

Football League First Division Winners: 1950–51

References

External links
 
 Team photo 1949-50
 Brittan's obituary

1927 births
2013 deaths
Footballers from Bristol
Association football wing halves
English footballers
Tottenham Hotspur F.C. players
Bedford Town F.C. players
English Football League players